Inmaculada Avelina Abang Ndong Nzang (born 8 December 2003), known as Avelina Abang or simply Avelina, is an Equatorial Guinean footballer who plays as a right back for Malabo Kings FC and the Equatorial Guinea women's national team.

Abang was ranked 16th by Goal in the NXGN 2022.

Club career
Abang has played for Leones Vegetarianos FC and Malabo Kings in Equatorial Guinea.

International career
Abang capped for Equatorial Guinea at senior level during the 2018 Africa Women Cup of Nations, playing in three matches.

References

External links

2003 births
Living people
Equatoguinean women's footballers
Women's association football fullbacks
Equatorial Guinea women's international footballers